Secrecy is the practice of sharing information among a group of people, which can be as small as one person, while hiding it from all others.

Secrecy may also refer to:
Secrecy (book), a 1998 novel by Belva Plain
Secrecy (film), a 2008 documentary film
Secrecy (band), German progressive metal band from Bremen formed in 1987

See also
Little Secrets (disambiguation)
Secret (disambiguation)
Secrets (disambiguation)